Iota Orionis (ι Orionis, abbreviated ι Ori) is a multiple star system in the equatorial constellation of Orion the hunter. It is the eighth-brightest member of Orion with an apparent visual magnitude of 2.77 and also the brightest member of the asterism known as Orion's Sword. It is a member of the NGC 1980 open cluster.

The system has three visible components designated Iota Orionis A, B and C.  Iota Orionis A has also been resolved using speckle interferometry and is also a massive spectroscopic binary, with components Iota Orionis Aa1 (officially named Hatysa ), Aa2, and Ab.

Nomenclature 

ι Orionis (Latinised to Iota Orionis) is the system's Bayer designation. The designations of the three constituents as Iota Orionis A, B and C, and those of A's components - Iota Orionis Aa1, Aa2, and Ab - derive from the convention used by the Washington Multiplicity Catalog (WMC) for multiple star systems, and adopted by the International Astronomical Union (IAU).

The system has the traditional name Nair al Saif, from the Arabic نير السيف nayyir as-sayf "the Bright One of the Sword", though this is little used.
Since Bečvář's 1951 Atlas Coeli, it has borne the proper name Hatysa. Kunitzsch was unable to find an older source for the latter name.

In 2016, the IAU organized a Working Group on Star Names (WGSN) to catalog and standardize proper names for stars. The WGSN decided to attribute proper names to individual stars rather than entire multiple systems. It approved the name Hatysa for the component Iota Orionis Aa on 5 September 2017 and it is now so included in the List of IAU-approved Star Names.

Iota Orionis B is a variable star and in 2011 it was given the variable star designation V2451 Orionis.

Distance 

There is little doubt that all three stars are at the same distance.

However, they may not lie at exactly the same distance and Iota Orionis may have a complex history involving stellar encounters and runaway stars. NGC 1980 contains few bright stars other than Iota Orionis. Only eighteen other stars are considered members in a survey down to 14th magnitude, most of them around 9th magnitude but including the 5th magnitude stars HR 1886 and 1887.

Properties 
Iota Orionis is dominated by the multiple star Iota Orionis A.  It is clearly identified as a double-lined spectroscopic binary whose components are a stellar class O9 III star (blue giant) and a class B0.8 III/IV star about 2 magnitudes fainter. The combined spectral type has long been accepted as O9 III and it was listed as a standard star for that type. The collision of the stellar winds from this pair makes the system a strong X-ray source. Oddly, the two objects of this system appear to have different ages, with the secondary being about double the age of the primary. In combination with the high eccentricity (e=0.764) of their 29-day orbit, this suggests that the binary system was created through a capture, rather than by being formed together and undergoing a mass transfer. This capture may have occurred, for example, through an encounter between two binary systems, with one star being donated from each binary and two runaway stars being ejected.

It is calculated to be around nine million years old.

Iota Orionis B is a B8 giant at 11" (approximately 5,000 AU) which has been shown to be variable, and likely to be a young stellar object.  It is also a helium-weak chemically peculiar star.  The fainter Iota Orionis C is an A0 star at 49".

References

External links
 Iota Orionis by Dr. Jim Kaler.
 David Darling's encyclopedia entry

O-type giants
B-type giants
B-type subgiants
A-type stars
Orion variables
Spectroscopic binaries
4

Orion (constellation)
J05352645-0554445
Orionis, Iota
Orionis, 44
1899
026241
037043
Durchmusterung objects
Orionis, V2451
Hatysa